David S. Schapira (born February 17, 1980) is an American politician who served from 2007–2013 in the Arizona Legislature, representing District 17, and served as Senate Minority Leader.
In 2010, he was elected to the Tempe Union High School District Governing Board where he served until 2015. He was elected to the Tempe City Council in 2014 and served there until 2018.

Early life, education, and career
Schapira is a third-generation Arizonan who was born in Mesa, Arizona. He later moved to Tempe and then to Phoenix, where he attended North Canyon High School as an International Baccalaureate student after which he attended George Washington University, earning a degree in political science. He returned to North Canyon High School to teach after college. He earned a Master's Degree in Education Leadership from Arizona State University in 2015. He earned a Juris Doctor degree at the Sandra Day O'Connor College of Law at Arizona State University in 2019.

After teaching high school, Schapira taught as an adjunct faculty member at Arizona State University. He served as Assistant Superintendent at the East Valley Institute of Technology from 2013–2017.

Political career

Arizona legislature
Schapira was first elected to the Arizona Legislature in 2006 as a member of the Arizona House of Representatives, representing the 17th district. He served two terms in the House before being elected to the Senate in 2010. As a freshman Senator, he was selected by his colleagues to serve as the Senate Minority Leader.

He served on the Appropriations Committee for his first five years in office and on the Education Committee all six years. He was the Education Committee's ranking member during his final term in the House and in the Senate. He also served on the Banking and Insurance Committee during his final year in the legislature.

2012 congressional campaign

On August 28, 2012, Schapira lost a race for the Democratic nomination to Congress in the newly created 9th district, placing second in the three-way primary, losing to future United States Senator Kyrsten Sinema.

2018 Superintendent of Public Instruction Campaign
Schapira was a candidate for Arizona Superintendent of Public Instruction in 2018. He ran in the Democratic primary and lost to Kathy Hoffman.

References

External links
 City Council Page
 State Legislature Page

Democratic Party Arizona state senators
1980 births
Living people
Democratic Party members of the Arizona House of Representatives
George Washington University alumni
Arizona State University alumni
Sandra Day O'Connor College of Law alumni